The acronym CCDR may refer to:

Canada Communicable Disease Report, a publication of the Public Health Agency of Canada
Cross-Cultural Dance Resources, a dance research organization in the United States
CCDRs or combatant commanders, leader of a unified combatant command in the U.S. military

See also
CDR (disambiguation)